The Cry Pretty Tour 360 was the sixth concert tour by American country music artist Carrie Underwood. The tour was in support of her sixth studio album Cry Pretty (2018), and began on May 1, 2019, in Greensboro, North Carolina and concluded on October 31, 2019, in Detroit, Michigan, playing 60 shows. It was also confirmed that $1 from every ticket sold would be donated to Danita's Children which helps children from Haiti.

Background and development
Underwood announced the tour and opening acts through an online video posted on August 8, 2018, along with the announcement of her pregnancy stating this as the reason for the tour's delay. The tour is supported by Maddie & Tae and Runaway June. On March 4, 2019, Underwood announced UK dates revolving around an appearance at the Glastonbury Festival supported by The Shires.

Reception
In July 2019, Billboard reported that Underwood could gross as much as $50 million from the tour, pointing out that almost "15 years into her career, Underwood's touring business continues to grow. Each of her six tours since 2006 have averaged a higher gross and attendance than the one before, including 2019's Cry Pretty Tour." The site also claimed the tour to have paced an average of $898,000 and 11,022 tickets per night.

Bob Mehr of Commercial Appeal applauded the show's pyrotechnics, but highlighted Underwood's voice, writing, "Despite all the showmanship, the real essence of Underwood — going all the way back to her breakthrough on American Idol nearly 15 years ago — is her voice, a uniquely thunderous mezzo soprano that has defined a generation of hits, from the opening "Southbound" to the concert capper "Love Wins"." Billy Dukes of Taste of Country wagered that the show might garner Underwood the CMA Entertainer of the Year award, writing, "The definition of "hit" is clearly changing. With some justice, the definition of "Entertainer of the Year" may soon be as well. It's not a man's world any longer. This is Carrie Underwood's EOTY tour." Holly Gleason of Pollstar praised Underwood's decision to bring an all-female lineup, writing, "While much discussion about a woman’s place in country music is happening, Underwood is walking instead of talking. Taking two young female acts on the road, she delivered an arena show that goes toe-to-toe with anyone in any genre, not just country, as a vocalist, as a show(wo)man, as the embodiment or realization of what the audience aspires to. And she does it in 5-inch heels." Bobby Olivier also praised Underwood's vocal delivery, saying, "But as with any of Underwood’s performances, dating back to her dominant run on “American Idol” in 2005, she was defined Wednesday by her overwhelming vocal ability — a titanic, relentless instrument rarely challenged by artists from any genre. She uses no backing track; it's just her, a nine-piece band (including one female background singer) and those propulsive pipes booming from the PA."

Setlist
This setlist is representative of the show on May 1, 2019, in Greensboro. It may not represent all dates throughout the tour.

 "Southbound"
 "Cowboy Casanova"
 "Good Girl"
 "Last Name"
 "Backsliding"
 "Church Bells"
 "Two Black Cadillacs"
 "Blown Away"
 "Drinking Alone"
 "End Up With You"
 "Flat on the Floor"
 "Wasted" 
 "Temporary Home" / "See You Again" / "I Know You Won't" / "Just a Dream" / "Dream On"
 "Jesus, Take the Wheel"
 "The Bullet"
 "Something in the Water"
 "Low"
 "Stand by Your Man" / "Walkin' After Midnight" / "Coal Miner's Daughter" / "9 to 5" / "Rockin' with the Rhythm of the Rain" / "She's in Love with the Boy" / "Independence Day" / "Wild One" / "Why Haven't I Heard from You" / "Man! I Feel Like a Woman!"
 "Undo It"
 "The Champion"
 "Before He Cheats"
 "Cry Pretty"
 "Love Wins"

Notes
For her performances at the Glastonbury Festival, the setlist consisted of: "Church Bells", "Cowboy Casanova", "Last Name", "Wasted", "Jesus, Take the Wheel", "Flat on the Floor", "Southbound", "Just a Dream/Dream On", "Love Wins", "Two Black Cadillacs", "Blown Away", "Cry Pretty", "Undo It", "Smoke Break" and "Before He Cheats".
During the UK tour, "Backsliding" and the Women of Country medley were not performed.

Tour dates

References

Notes

Citations 

2019 concert tours
Carrie Underwood concert tours